Menemerus bifurcus is a jumping spider species in the genus Menemerus that lives in Southern Africa. It was first described by Wanda Wesołowska in 1999.

References

Salticidae
Spiders of Africa
Spiders described in 1999
Taxa named by Wanda Wesołowska